Ericales and Cornales, two orders of flowering plants, are often called the basal asterids, since they were the first asterid orders to diverge from the others, roughly 100 million years ago.  Like most asterids, these species tend to have petals that are fused with each other and with the bases of the stamens, and just one integument (covering) around the embryo sac.

The basal asterids include crops such as blueberries, cranberries, tea and Brazil nuts. Kiwifruit was named for its resemblance to the brown body of the kiwi, a national symbol of New Zealand. Dogwoods (Cornus) are often grown for their showy bracts. Black or white ebony wood is commonly used for musical instruments and carpentry. Many Hydrangea species are popular garden ornamentals.

Glossary
From the glossary of botanical terms:
annual: a plant that completes its life cycle (i.e. germinates, reproduces, and dies) within a single year or growing season
deciduous: shedding or falling seasonally, as with bark, leaves, or petals
herbaceous: not woody; usually green and soft in texture
mangrove: any shrub or small tree that grows in brackish or salt water
perennial: not an annual or biennial
succulent (adjective): juicy or fleshy

There are a few visible traits that can be linked to many of the families. Most Ericales species tend to have woody stems or branches, seed capsules, cellular endosperm and ladder-like vessel perforations. Species in Cornales tend to have the same perforations, as well as anthers attached at their base, ring-like nectaries, and cymes, which are inflorescences with lateral stalks that terminate in a flower or another branch.

Families

See also

Notes

Citations

References

 
   See the licence.
 
 
  
 
  See their terms-of-use license.
 
 
 
 
 

Systematic
Taxonomic lists (families)
Gardening lists
Lists of plants